Gungmangbong is a mountain in Gyeonggi-do, South Korea. Its area extends across Gapyeong County and the city Pocheon.

See also
 List of mountains in Korea

Notes

References
 

Mountains of Gyeonggi Province
Pocheon
Gapyeong County
Mountains of South Korea
One-thousanders of South Korea